Frances Wilson (born 1964) is an English author, academic, and critic.

Biography
Born in Malawi, she attended The Mount School, York, and read English literature at St Hugh's College, Oxford. She received a DPhil on Henry James and Freud from Sussex University. She taught English literature at Reading University for ten years, leaving in 2005 to become a full-time writer. She reviews for The Times Literary Supplement, The Spectator, The Oldie, New Statesman, The Guardian, and The Daily Telegraph, and has been a judge for the Whitbread Biography Prize, the Man Booker Prize, the Baillie Gifford Prize, and was chair of the 2020 Goldsmiths Prize. She has been writer in residence at Somerset House and University College London, taught a University of East Anglia/Guardian Masterclass in Biography and has been a Fellow of the Royal Society of Literature since 2009. From 2016 until 2021 she taught creative writing and English literature at Goldsmiths, University of London. She is a co-founder of the how to Academy.

Wilson was the Jean Strouse Fellow at the Dorothy and Lewis B. Cullman Center for Scholars and Writers at the New York Public Library from 2018 to 2019, where she worked on a biography of D.H. Lawrence, which was published by FSG in America and by Bloomsbury Circus in the UK in 2021.

Works
Wilson is the author of six books: 
Literary Seductions: Compulsive Writers and Diverted Readers (St. Martin's Press, 2000).
The Courtesan’s Revenge: Harriette Wilson, the Woman Who Blackmailed the King (Faber & Faber, 2003).
The Ballad of Dorothy Wordsworth (Faber, 2008) Winner of the British Academy's Rose Mary Crawshay Prize.
How To Survive the Titanic; or The Sinking of J. Bruce Ismay (Bloomsbury, 2011) Winner of the Elizabeth Longford Prize for historical biography, 2012.
Guilty Thing: A Life of Thomas De Quincey (Bloomsbury Publishing, 2016; Farrar, Straus and Giroux, 2016) Longlisted for the Baillie Gifford Prize 2016, shortlisted for the National Book Critics Circle Award, the LA Times Book Awards, the Historical Writers' Association Non-Fiction Crown award and the BIO Plutarch Prize, named Book of the Year in The Guardian, TLS, The Spectator, and The Telegraph, and cited by Booklist as one of the ten best-reviewed books in America during 2016.
Burning Man: The Ascent of D.H. Lawrence (London: Bloomsbury Circus, 2021); Burning Man: The Trials of D.H. Lawrence (New York: Farrar, Straus and Giroux, 2021) Winner of the 2022 Plutarch Award, and shortlisted for the Duff Cooper Prize and the James Tait Black Memorial Prize. 

She has written introductions to 
Henry James, A Small Boy and Others: Childhood Memoirs (Gibson Square Books, 2001).
Henry James, The Wings of the Dove (Folio Society, 2005).
Henry James, The Ambassadors (Folio Society, 2006).
The Adventures of Casanova (Folio Society, 2007).
Daniel Defoe, Roxanna (Folio Society, 2010).
Thomas Bernhard, My Prizes: An Accounting (Notting Hill Editions, 2011).
Lorna Sage, Bad Blood (Fourth Estate, 2020)
D.H. Lawrence, The Man Who Loved Islands: Sixteen Stories by D.H. Lawrence (riverrun editions, 2021)

References

1964 births
Living people
Alumni of St Hugh's College, Oxford
Academics of the University of Reading
Alumni of the University of Sussex
People educated at The Mount School, York
Rose Mary Crawshay Prize winners
English literary critics
Fellows of the Royal Society of Literature